Désobéissance (meaning Disobedience) is the eleventh studio album by French singer Mylène Farmer, released by Sony Music Entertainment on 28 September 2018. On 30 November 2018, the album was re-released with a bonus DVD. Désobéissance topped the chart in France and Belgium Wallonia, and reached number 3 in Switzerland and number 19 in Belgium Flanders.

Commercial reception
Désobéissance debuted at number one in France, selling 90,379 units (84,142 in physical sales, 4,144 in downloads and 2,092 in streaming). It became the album with the third-largest opening sales week of 2018, after Mon pays c'est l'amour by Johnny Hallyday, which has sold 780,177 copies (758,056 in physical sales, 14,332 in downloads and 7,789 in streaming), and Enfoirés 2018: Musique! by Les Enfoirés (129,391 units). On the album's release day, Désobéissance was certified Gold by SNEP. In the second week, Désobéissance has sold 21,240 units (20,222 in sales and 1,018 in streaming), and fell to number four on the Top Albums Chart (Sales + Streaming) and number two on the Top Albums Chart (Sales). On 5 October 2018, the album was certified Platinum in France for sales of 100,000 units. In the third week, Désobéissance has sold 13,700 units (12,640 in sales and 1,060 in streaming), and stayed number four on the Top Albums Chart (Sales + Streaming) and fell to number three on the Top Albums Chart (Sales). In the fourth week, the album has sold 11,820 units, and fell to number seven on the Top Albums Chart (Sales + Streaming) and number five on the Top Albums Chart (Sales). On 14 December 2018, Désobéissance was certified 2× Platinum by SNEP. In 2018, it has sold 213,000 copies in France.

Track listing

Charts

Weekly charts

Year-end charts

Certifications

|}

References

2018 albums
Mylène Farmer albums